Bloody Run may refer to:

Places
Bloody Run (Iowa), a tributary of the East Fork Des Moines River, flowing through Humboldt County, Iowa, United States
Bloody Run (Michigan), formerly Parent's Creek, location of the Battle of Bloody Run (July 31, 1763) in Detroit
Bloody Run (Poquessing Creek), a tributary of Poquessing Creek in the Somerton section of Philadelphia, Pennsylvania, United States 
Bloody Run (Raystown Branch Juniata River), a tributary of the Raystown Branch Juniata River in Bedford County, Pennsylvania, United States 
Bloody Run (Wisconsin), a tributary to Nepco Lake
Bloody Run Hills, a mountain range in Humboldt County, Nevada, United States
Everett, Pennsylvania, a borough in  Bedford County, Pennsylvania, originally known as Bloody Run

Battles
Battle of Bloody Run, the name ascribed to a July 1763 battle, part of the conflict known as Pontiac's War (alternatively as Pontiac's Rebellion), fought near Fort Detroit (Present day Detroit Michigan's Near-East Side)

Other
Bloody Run Canoe Classic, a community canoe and kayak race along the Raystown Branch of the Juniata River in Everett, Pennsylvania, United States 
”Ballad of Bloody Run”, a 2006 song on the album Dead FM by Strike Anywhere